The 2013 World Archery Championships was the 47th edition of the event. It was held in Antalya, Turkey from 29 September to 6 October 2013 and was organised by World Archery Federation (FITA). It was immediately preceded by the 50th World Archery Federation congress in the same location. Qualification and elimination rounds took place at the Papillon Sports Centre in nearby Kadriye, with the medal matches on 5–6 October on the beach of Belek.

For the first time, the event was streamed live on the World Archery Federation YouTube channel, ArcheryTV. The recurve team final was broadcast live on Eurosport 2 and other finals shown on a delay.

Schedule
All times are local (UTC+02:00).

Medals table

Medals summary

Recurve

Compound

Participating nations
At the close of registrations, 69 nations had registered 441 athletes, fewer than the 2011 World Championships which had doubled as qualification for the 2012 Olympic competition.

  (6)
  (2)
  (12)
  (6)
  (6)
  (7)
  (4)
  (4)
  (12)
  (12)
  (2)
  (6)
  (6)
  (12)
  (5)
  (4)
  (6)
  (8)
  (2)
  (1)
  (7)
  (7)
  (12)
  (3)
  (12)
  (2)
  (2)
  (1)
  (12)
  (4)
  (5)
  (4)
  (1)
  (12)
  (4)
  (8)
  (12)
  (4)
  (12)
  (3)
  (3)
  (7)
  (3)
  (4)
  (12)
  (2)
  (6)
  (10)
  (2)
  (8)
  (9)
  (1)
  (4)
  (12)
  (4)
  (8)
  (2)
  (6)
  (9)
  (1)
  (10)
  (7)
  (2)
  (6)
  (12)
  (7)
  (12)
  (12)
  (11)

References

External links
 Official website 

 
World Championship
World Archery
World Archery Championships
International archery competitions hosted by Turkey
September 2013 sports events in Turkey
October 2013 sports events in Turkey
Sport in Antalya